Andrea Cionna (born 1968) is an Italian athlete from Osimo in the Province of Ancona. He holds the world record for the fastest marathon run by a totally blind man, set in 2:31:59 in Rome in 2007, and has won two bronze medals in blind long-distance running at the Paralympic Games.

Biography 
Cionna first competed at the Paralympic Games in 2004, entering two long-distance events and running with a sighted guide. In the 10,000 metres T11 event for totally blind runners, he finished third in 33:59.98, winning the bronze medal, behind Kenya's Henry Wanyoike (gold) and Portugal's Carlos Amaral Ferreira (silver). In the T11 marathon, he also finished third, in 2:49:59, behind Japan's Yuichi Takahashi (gold), and Portugal's Carlos Ferreira (silver).

He competed again at the Paralympics in 2008, a year after setting a world record in the blind marathon. At the 2008 Paralympics, however, the T11 marathon had been abolished as a separate event, and athletes categorised T11 (totally blind) ran in the same marathon as athletes categorised T12 (partially sighted). Cionna ran fastest of the blind athletes, setting a Paralympic record for his category in 2:36:43, but he finished the race in seventh place, behind six runners categorised T12. The marathon was the only event he entered; the 10,000 metre race was now also a T12 event.

See also 
 Marathon at the Paralympics
 Italy at the 2004 Summer Paralympics

References

External links
 

Paralympic athletes of Italy
Athletes (track and field) at the 2004 Summer Paralympics
Athletes (track and field) at the 2008 Summer Paralympics
Paralympic bronze medalists for Italy
Italian male marathon runners
1968 births
Living people
Sportspeople from the Province of Ancona
World record holders in Paralympic athletics
Medalists at the 2004 Summer Paralympics
Paralympic medalists in athletics (track and field)